Conus mariaodeteae is a species of sea snail, a marine gastropod mollusc in the family Conidae, the cone snails, cone shells or cones.

These snails are predatory and venomous. They are capable of "stinging" humans.

Description

Distribution
This marine species in the Atlantic Ocean off Brazil.

References

 Petuch E.J. & Myers R.F. (2014). Additions to the cone shell faunas (Conidae and Conilithidae) of the Cearaian and Bahian subprovinces, Brazilian Molluscan Province. Xenophora Taxonomy. 4: 30-43.
page(s): 33

External links
 To World Register of Marine Species
 

mariaodeteae
Gastropods described in 2014